Halifax F.C. was an English football club based in Halifax, West Yorkshire.

History
The club was a founder member of the first incarnation of the Yorkshire Football League in 1897, but finished third bottom and resigned from the competition after just one year.

The team was a part of the bigger Halifax Cricket and Football Club, who were beset by financial problems for many years before finally being wound up in the 1900s.

References

Defunct football clubs in England
Yorkshire Football League
Defunct football clubs in West Yorkshire
Association football clubs established in the 19th century
Association football clubs disestablished in 1898